The Edmonton Oil Kings are a major junior ice hockey team based in Edmonton, Alberta, Canada, that play in the Western Hockey League (WHL). As of July 2008, they are owned by Daryl Katz's Oilers Entertainment Group, which also owns the Edmonton Oilers. The 2007–08 season was the newest incarnation of the Oil Kings' inaugural season in the WHL. Some NHL alumni include Tomas Vincour, Mark Pysyk, Curtis Lazar, Keegan Lowe, Griffin Reinhart, Henrik Samuelsson, Laurent Brossoit, Tristan Jarry and David Musil. As the 2012 WHL champions, the Oil Kings played in the 2012 Memorial Cup, losing 6–1 against the eventual winning team, the Shawinigan Cataractes, in the playoff tie-breaker. The Oil Kings won the 2014 Memorial Cup, defeating the Guelph Storm in the final game.

Franchise history 

The newest incarnation of the Oil Kings are the fourth WHL team to play in Edmonton, preceded by the first Edmonton Oil Kings (1951–76), the second Edmonton Oil Kings (1978–79) and the Edmonton Ice (1996–98).

The original Edmonton Oil Kings were a junior hockey team that played in the original Western Canada Junior Hockey League from 1951 to 1956. They then played with the senior amateur Central Alberta Hockey League from 1956 to 1965, winning the 1963 Memorial Cup. They joined the Alberta Senior Hockey League for the 1965–66 season, prior to jumping to the new Western Canada Junior Hockey League in 1966. The Oil Kings were also initially successful in the WCHL, capturing two President's Cup titles. However, with the arrival of the World Hockey Association and the Oilers in 1972, the junior club's attendance began to plummet. Approximately 150,000 fans went to Oil Kings games in 1971–72. That number dropped to 90,000 the next year, and 68,000 the following year. The original Oil Kings moved to Portland, Oregon in 1976, becoming the Portland Winter Hawks.

An attempt at reviving the Oil Kings in 1978 lasted only one season, as the juniors were once again unable to compete with the pros. Bill Hunter purchased the Flin Flon Bombers and brought them to Alberta's capital. However, the team only averaged about 500 fans per game, and rumours that the team would again relocate began to swirl before the first season was even complete. The second Oil Kings relocated again to become the Great Falls Americans, where the team would only last 28 more games before folding.

Despite the long-held belief that major-junior hockey could not survive against the pros, the WHL returned to Calgary in 1995, and Edmonton in 1996. At the time, the Oilers were struggling on the ice, as well as attendance. The Oilers refused to work with the Edmonton Ice, blocking them from playing in Northlands Coliseum, thus relegating them to the substandard Northlands Agricom. The Ice relocated to Cranbrook, British Columbia, becoming the Kootenay Ice, after two underwhelming seasons.

"Return of the Kings" 

With the Flames owned Hitmen leading the WHL in attendance the past four seasons, and the Vancouver Giants also proving to be a major success at the gate, the Oilers ownership group had spent the last three years attempting to purchase a WHL team, even going so far as to put out an open offer of $5 million - well over market value - for any WHL franchise in 2004. With no takers, and with the 2004–05 NHL lockout looming, the Oilers chose to relocate their AHL team to Rexall Place as the Edmonton Roadrunners. Despite finishing third in the AHL in attendance, and having publicly promised to operate the team in Edmonton for at least three seasons, the Oilers suspended the Roadrunners after only one season rather than have their minor league team competing against themselves. The Oilers then resumed their quest for a WHL team.

When the sale of the Tri-City Americans to Chilliwack, British Columbia failed, the WHL placed an expansion team in Chilliwack, and the door for Edmonton was finally reopened. While the league had previously refused to consider further expansion, believing 20 teams was enough, the addition of the Chilliwack Bruins left the league with an odd number of franchises. Preferring an even number of teams, the league announced its return to Edmonton on March 16, 2006 with the granting of a conditional expansion franchise, named the Edmonton Oil Kings in homage to the former franchise.

The team began play in the 2007–08 WHL season and finished with a record of 22–39–11, good for 55 points, but not enough to make the playoffs.

The Oil Kings most recently captured the Ed Chynoweth Cup twice as victors of the WHL playoffs for the 2011–12 and 2013–14 WHL seasons, earning berths to the 2012 and 2014 Memorial Cups. On May 25, 2014 the Oil Kings won the franchise's third, first for the reborn team, Memorial Cup after defeating the Ontario Hockey League champion Guelph Storm by a score of 6–3.

In 2022, the Oil Kings won their 3rd Ed Chynoweth Cup by the Seattle Thunderbirds in six games earning them an appearance at the 2022 Memorial Cup.

Season-by-season record 
Note: GP = Games played, W = Wins, L = Losses, OTL = Overtime losses, SOL = Shootout losses Pts = Points, GF = Goals for, GA = Goals against

WHL Championship history
2011–12: Win, 4–3 vs Portland
2012–13: Loss, 2–4 vs Portland
2013–14: Win, 4–3 vs Portland
2021–22: Win, 4–2 vs Seattle

Memorial Cup Final history
2012: Eliminated in round-robin
2014: Win, 6–3 vs Guelph (OHL)
2022: Eliminated in round-robin

Current roster 
Updated January 10, 2023.

 

 

 
 
 

 

 
 

 

 
 

 
 

|}

WHL awards and trophies 
Ed Chynoweth Cup
2011–12, 2013–14, 2021–22

Scotty Munro Memorial Trophy
2011–12, 2020–21

Jim Piggott Memorial Trophy
Dylan Guenther: 2019–20

WHL Plus-Minus Award
Ashton Sautner: 2013–14

Brad Hornung Trophy
Dylan Wruck: 2012–13Dunc McCallum Memorial Trophy
Brad Lauer: 2019–20

Lloyd Saunders Memorial Trophy
Bob Green: 2011–12, 2012–13

St. Clair Group Trophy
2018–19

Doug Wickenheiser Memorial Trophy
Will Warm: 2018–19
Luke Prokop: 2021–22

WHL Playoff MVP
Laurent Brossoit: 2011–12
Griffin Reinhart: 2013–14
Kaiden Guhle: 2021–22

Memorial Cup trophies 
Memorial Cup
2014

Stafford Smythe Memorial Trophy
Edgars Kulda: 2014Ed Chynoweth Trophy
Henrik Samuelsson: 2014

George Parsons Trophy
Curtis Lazar: 2014

NHL alumni

NHL 1st round draft picks
2010 NHL Entry Draft – Mark Pysyk #23 Overall (Buffalo Sabres)
2012 NHL Entry Draft – Griffin Reinhart #4 Overall (New York Islanders)
2012 NHL Entry Draft – Henrik Samuelsson #27 Overall (Phoenix Coyotes)
2013 NHL Entry Draft – Curtis Lazar #17 Overall (Ottawa Senators)
2020 NHL Entry Draft – Jake Neighbours #26 Overall (St. Louis Blues)
2021 NHL Entry Draft – Dylan Guenther #9 Overall (Arizona Coyotes)
2021 NHL Entry Draft – Sebastian Cossa #15 Overall (Detroit Red Wings)

See also
Edmonton Oil Kings (WCHL)
List of ice hockey teams in Alberta

Notes

External links
Official website of the Edmonton Oil Kings
Official website of the Western Hockey League
Official website of the Canadian Hockey League
Article about team's return (TSN)

2007 establishments in Alberta
Ice hockey clubs established in 2007
Ice hockey teams in Alberta
Oil
Western Hockey League teams
Oilers Entertainment Group